Lowland Peruvian Quechua, or Chachapoyas–Lamas Quechua, are Quechuan languages spoken in the lowlands of northern Peru. The two principal varieties are:
 
Lamas Quechua, or San Martín Quechua (Lamista, Llakwash Runashimi), spoken in Lamas Province of San Martín Region, as well as in some villages on the Huallaga River in the Ucayali Region by some 15,000 people
Chachapoyas Quechua or Amazonas Quechua, spoken in Chachapoyas Province and Luya Province in the Amazonas Region by some 7000 people

Few children are learning Chachapoyas Quechua. Conila is said to be the last village where children are able to speak it.

Lowland Peruvian Quechua is similar in pronunciation to some of the Ecuadorian Kichwa language varieties. It is much more conservative, however, in its morphology. For example, it has retained the inclusive/exclusive distinction for "we", which has been lost in all of the Ecuadorian Quechuan languages.

References

Bibliography
 Gerald Taylor, 2006. Diccionario Quechua Chachapoyas-Lamas (– Castellano)
 Marinerell Park, Nancy Weber, Víctor Cenepo S. 1975. Diccionario Quechua de San Martín – Castellano y vice versa. Ministerio de educación del Perú

Languages of Peru
Quechuan languages